Visnea mocanera is a species of plant in the Pentaphylacaceae family. It is found in Madeira and the Canary Islands in Macaronesia. It is threatened by habitat loss.

References

Pentaphylacaceae
Flora of the Canary Islands
Flora of Madeira
Conservation dependent plants
Taxonomy articles created by Polbot